Kenridge is a suburb in  Bellville, Western Cape, South Africa. It became a suburb out of one of the Tygerberg’s original farms.

History

On 17 October 1714, the Governor of the Cape Colony award the farm Blommesteijn to Theuns Dirksz van Schalkwyk. Van Schalkwyk was a Dutch immigrant. In September 1732, the farm was granted to van Schalkwyk’s daughter Anna Dirksz Brommert (Nee van Schalkwyk). At the same time Anna also received Door de Kraal farm, which previously belonged to Tryntje Theuinisse. These two farms became one and was known as Door de Kraal. Johan Albrecht Dell was the new owner in 1814. Cornelis Valkenburg de Villiers bought the farm in 1866, and his son JH de Villiers inherited it in 1899. He divided the farm in four parts; one part remained Door de Kraal, one part he sold to Hume Pipe Company (This company mined clay in Bellville's Quarry), one part he gave his son JJH de Villiers (it was called de Bron) and the fourth part to PHT de Villiers (it was called Witboom). PHT de Villiers sold Witboom for residential development in 1948. It then became Kenridge. (PHT de Villiers part was the old Blommesteijn farm).

Municipal dispute

In 1969, a dispute arose between the municipalities of Bellville and Durbanville, as to under whose jurisdiction Kenridge fell. In January 1971, it was decided that Kenridge fell under Bellville and the area closer to Durbanville under their jurisdiction. The Durbanville area was then called Kenridge Heights.

Schools

Only one school is in the area namely Kenridge Primary. An old farm cowshed was not yet demolished in 1954. In January 1955, the school started in the cowshed. It was called "old Barn". The school was official opened by P Swiegelaar on 20 September 1956. Head Masters through the years were: (1955-1957) P. Marsford, (1957-1971)F.Swiegelaar, (1971- 1972) L. Hoorn, (1972- 1989) G. F. van Wyk,(1989- 1993) M. Lötter, (1993- 2010) G.V. Albrecht and from 2010 S. Smith. Jacobus Johannes (Koos) de Villiers owner of the farm Morgenster Durbanville hills and husband of endurance horse rider Gillese Hayward.
was one of the first pupils.

Surrounding suburbs

It is surrounded by fellow Bellville suburbs, Eversdal and Door-de-Kraal. As it is on the border of Bellville, it has a Durbanville neighbouring suburb called Durbanville Hills and Kenridge Heights.

Notable residents

Amore Bekker Radio presenter at Radio Sonder Grense (RSG)
Dane Piedt  Off-breaker bowler for South Africa national cricket team (Proteas)
Stiaan van Zyl Al-rounder for South Africa national cricket team (Proteas)
Jean-Luc du Plessis(son of Carel du Plessis)  fly-half for the rugby team Stormers

Climate

It rains primarily in the winter, with average rainfall of 465mm per year. It seldom gets colder than 7 °C and its average temperature in the months of November to February is 26 °C to 27 °C.

References 

Suburbs of Cape Town